The 2006 Buffalo Bills season was the franchise's 47th season as a football team, 37th in the National Football League and first under both general manager Marv Levy and head coach Dick Jauron. Levy, who previously coached the team from 1986-1997, leading them to four straight AFC Championships and four straight Super Bowl appearances from 1990-1993, replaced Tom Donahoe, who was fired shortly after the end of the 2005 season, with hopes that his 11 full seasons as Bills head coach would improve a franchise that failed to make the playoffs during Donahoe's tenure. Jauron, who previously coached the Chicago Bears from 1999-2003, replaced Mike Mularkey, who resigned shortly after Donahoe's firing, citing family reasons and disagreement over the direction of the organization. The Bills hoped to improve on their 5-11 record from 2005, while also hoping to make the playoffs for the first time since 1999, but a 30-29 loss to the Tennessee Titans eliminated the team from playoff contention, extending their playoff drought to seven straight seasons, tying a record set from 1967-1973. For the second consecutive season, the Bills' opening day starting quarterback was J. P. Losman.

NFL Draft

Notes
 The Bills acquired an additional first-round selection (26th overall), later revealed to be John McCargo, as part of a draft-day trade that sent their second-round pick (42nd overall), later revealed to be Danieal Manning, to the Chicago Bears.

Staff

Roster

Preseason

Schedule

Regular season

Schedule

Game summaries

Week 1: at New England Patriots

The Bills opened the regular season on the road against the first of their three divisional rivals, the New England Patriots and got off to a fast start, as on the very first play, Takeo Spikes sacked Tom Brady, causing a fumble recovered by London Fletcher-Baker for a 5-yard TD. The Patriots tied the game up at 7-7 on a 9-yard pass from Brady to Troy Brown. The Bills would regain the lead on a 53-yard FG by Rian Lindell. In the second quarter, Anthony Thomas would make the score 17-7 at halftime with an 18-yard run. However, the Bills continued their late-game struggles from 2005, as they gave up 12 unanswered points in the second half (a 17-yard pass from Brady to Kevin Faulk, a
32-yard FG by Stephen Gostkowski and a safety by Ty Warren with 8:33 remaining in the fourth quarter), dropping the Bills to 0–1 to start the season.

Week 2: at Miami Dolphins

For Week 2, the Bills traveled to Dolphin Stadium to take on the second of their three divisional rivals, the Miami Dolphins. The Bills managed to get the only score of the first half, a 33-yard field goal by kicker Rian Lindell in the first quarter. It wasn't until the third quarter that the Bills were to score again when quarterback J. P. Losman threw a 4-yard pass to Josh Reed, while Lindell kicked a pair of FGs, a 45-yarder and a 43-yarder. Even though the Dolphins did manage to score in the fourth quarter on a 23-yard pass from Daunte Culpepper to Chris Chambers (with a failed 2-point conversion), the Bills defense dominated the game, sacking Culpepper seven times (along with two forced fumbles) and blocking a punt, improving the Bills to 1-1.

Week 3: vs. New York Jets

Dressed up in their 1960s throwback jerseys, the Bills played their Week 3 home-opener against their last divisional rival, the New York Jets. Buffalo started off with J. P. Losman throwing a 51-yard pass to Roscoe Parrish for the only score in the first quarter. In the second quarter, the Jets tied the game up with a
3-yard run by Kevan Barlow. The Bills managed to get a 36-yard FG by Rian Lindell, but the Jets managed to take the lead, as Chad Pennington completed a 1-yard TD pass to Chris Baker within the closing seconds of the half. In the second half, the Bills fell behind as Victor Hobson returned a Buffalo fumble 32 yards for a touchdown, which would be the only score of the third quarter. In the fourth quarter, the Bills tried to close the gap, as Lindell kicked a 28-yard field goal. However, the Jets increased their lead with Cedric Houston getting a 5-yard run. The Bills would get another score, though—a 12-yard Losman run. Even though the Bills recovered their onside kick, they went three-and-out to end any more scoring threats, dropping to 1-2.

Week 4: Minnesota Vikings

Looking to bounce back from a tough home-opening loss to the New York Jets, the Bills took on the first of their four NFC North rivals, the Minnesota Vikings. In the first quarter, Buffalo got a small deficit as kicker Ryan Longwell kicked a 37-yard FG for the only score of the quarter. In the second quarter, the Bills scored on a Willis McGahee 1-yard run. Afterwards, Minnesota got a last-second FG by Longwell, this one from 49 yards out. In the third quarter, Buffalo pulled ahead as J. P. Losman completed an 8-yard pass to Peerless Price for the only score of the period. In the fourth quarter, Rian Lindell kicked a 28-yard FG. However, Brad Johnson completed a 29-yard pass to Marcus Robinson, but Buffalo prevented the two-point conversion and ran the clock out, giving the Bills their first home victory of the year and improving to 2-2.

Week 5: at Chicago Bears

Looking for their second road victory of the season, the Bills traveled to Soldier Field to take on the second of their four NFC North rivals, the Chicago Bears, in Dick Jauron's first return to Chicago since being fired at the end of the  Chicago Bears season. From the start, Buffalo was in trouble, as Robbie Gould kicked two FGs in the first quarter—a 42-yarder and a 43-yarder. Then, in the second quarter, three straight scores came from the Bears—an 8-yard pass from Rex Grossman to Bernard Berrian, a 1-yard run from Cedric Benson and a 15-yard pass from Grossman to Rashied Davis—that put the Bills in a deep hole. In the third quarter, Gould put up another FG for Chicago, this time from 32 yards out, while in the fourth quarter, Gould would kick a 41-yard FG and Benson would get another 1-yard run. The Bills would finally get on the board, as J. P. Losman completed a 5-yard strike to Lee Evans, ending the Bears' 11-quarter streak of not allowing their opponents to score a TD going back to the fourth quarter of the Bears' 34-7 victory against the Detroit Lions in Week 2, but the damage was already done, as the loss dropped the Bills to 2-3.

Week 6: at Detroit Lions

The Bills flew to Ford Field to take on the third of their four NFC North rivals, the Detroit Lions. From the start, the winless Lions were dominated the first quarter, as kicker Jason Hanson kicked a 43-yard FG, while Kevin Jones got a 7-yard run. In the second quarter, Buffalo got into the game, as J. P. Losman completed a 44-yard pass to Roscoe Parrish. However, Detroit responded, as Jon Kitna completed a 28-yard TD pass to Roy Williams. The Bills would get kicker Rian Lindell to get a 53-yard field goal to end the half. After a scoreless third quarter, Lions kicker Hanson got a 29-yard field goal, putting Detroit up 20-10. The Bills tried to catch-up, as Losman completed a 4-yard pass to Ryan Neufeld, but the deficit proved to be a little too much, as the Lions ended up getting their first win of the season at the Bills' expense, dropping the Bills to 2-4.

Week 7: vs. New England Patriots

Coming off two straight road losses to an NFC North team, the Bills returned home for a rematch with the New England Patriots. In the first meeting in Week 1, New England came back to win, thanks to late-game struggles by the Bills. This time, however, it wasn't even close. In the first quarter, the Patriots took an early lead with the first of Corey Dillon's two runs, an 8-yarder.  Kicker Rian Lindell would get a 40-yard field goal, but the Patriots wouldn't allow Buffalo to score, as Dillon got his second of the game, a 12-yarder. After a scoreless second quarter, the Patriots continued to make the game difficult for the Bills as in the third quarter, Tom Brady threw a 35-yard pass to Chad Jackson for the only score of the period. In the fourth quarter, Lindell would get another field goal, this one from 46 yards out, but the damage was already done, as Brady put the icing on the game with his second pass, this one a 5-yarder to Doug Gabriel, sweeping the Bills for a third-straight year and dropping them to 2-5 heading into the bye week.

Week 9: vs. Green Bay Packers

Coming off their bye week, the Bills stayed home for a Week 9 matchup with their final NFC North rival, the Green Bay Packers. In the first quarter, even though Willis McGahee left with injured ribs, kicker Rian Lindell kicked a 28-yard field goal for the only score of the period. In the second quarter, Buffalo's defense joined in the scoring party as London Fletcher-Baker returned an interception 17 yards for a touchdown for the only score of the period. In the third quarter, Brett Favre hooked up with Donald Driver on a 1-yard pass for the only score of the period. In the fourth quarter, Packers kicker Dave Rayner kicked a 49-yard FG to tie the game up 10-10. The Bills increased their margin as J. P. Losman completed a 43-yard pass to Lee Evans. Afterwards, a 76-yard interception return by Ko Simpson  set up a 14-yard run by Anthony Thomas, improving the Bills to 3-5.

Week 10: at Indianapolis Colts

Fresh off their victory over the Packers, the Bills flew out to the RCA Dome for a Week 10 matchup with the Indianapolis Colts. Much like they did in the season-opener against the Patriots, Buffalo got off to a fast start in the first quarter with kicker Rian Lindell making a 22-yard field goal for the only score of the period. In the second quarter, however, Indianapolis struck back with Peyton Manning completing a 1-yard pass to Reggie Wayne. The Colts would follow that up with kicker Adam Vinatieri kicking a 31-yard FG. The Bills defense did make a stand, though, as Terrence McGee returned a fumble 68 yards for a touchdown. In the third quarter, Indianapolis regained the lead with Joseph Addai completing a 5-yard run. Buffalo would respond with Lindell making a
30-yard FG. In the fourth quarter, the Bills drew closer with Lindell's 43-yard FG and had a chance to take the lead late in the game, let alone win, but a 41-yard try went wide right, not only dropping the Bills to 3-6, but last place in the AFC East.

Week 11: at Houston Texans

This Week 11 matchup against the Texans was expected to be a boring affair, but it was anything but. The first quarter saw a dominating offensive performance by Lee Evans, who caught six passes for 205 yards and a pair of 83-yard touchdowns, falling just five yards short of the NFL mark for most yards receiving in a quarter of 210 set by Qadry Ismail in 1999. However, Houston was not intimidated and kept the game close going into halftime. In the second half, the Bills' offense slowed down greatly, but Houston kept flying, mostly on the arm of David Carr, who tied the NFL record for most consecutive completions in a game with 22. Dunta Robinson intercepted a Losman pass and ran it in for an easy score, giving the Texans a 21-17 edge that held until the final seconds, when Losman led the Bills down the field and hit Peerless Price for the game-winning 9-yard catch in the back of the end zone with 0:09 remaining (the play was reviewed and upheld) for the 24-21 victory in a game where Losman set a career-high for passing yardage with 340 and Evans set a new franchise record with 265 yards receiving. With the win, the Bills improved to 4-6.

Week 12: vs Jacksonville Jaguars

With the momentum of a late-game victory against Houston and the return of Willis McGahee, who had missed the previous three weeks with rib injuries, the Bills took an early lead and held off the Jaguars at the end. After Jacksonville scored with 0:34 remaining and after a questionable squib kick, J. P. Losman threw a pass down the sideline to Roscoe Parrish who kept his toes in just enough to set up a game-winning Rian Lindell 42-yard FG as time expired. Parrish had earlier made the game's biggest play of the game when he had an 81-yard punt return in the third quarter. With their second straight victory, the Bills improved to
5-6.

Week 13: San Diego Chargers

Keeping some slim playoff hopes alive, the Bills stayed home, donned their throwback jerseys again and faced a fierce Week 13 challenge against the San Diego Chargers. In the first quarter, the Chargers struck first with kicker Nate Kaeding getting a 42-yard FG, while LaDainian Tomlinson got a 51-yard run. In the second quarter, Buffalo continued to struggle as Philip Rivers completed an 11-yard pass to Antonio Gates for the only score of the period. In the third quarter, the Bills scored with J. P. Losman completing a 6-yard pass to Robert Royal, while Willis McGahee got a 2-yard run. However, in the fourth quarter, Tomlinson got his second touchdown run of the day, a 2-yarder. A 6-yard pass from Losman to Peerless Price closed the gap, but a failed onside kick sealed any chance of a comeback victory. With the loss, the Bills dropped to 5-7.

Week 14: at New York Jets

Hoping to avoid being swept by their AFC East rival and keep their playoff hopes alive all at the same time, the Bills met the Jets in The Meadowlands. Willis McGahee extended his string of 100-yard rushing games vs. the Jets to five with 125 yards on 16 carries, including a 57-yard run in the first quarter. After allowing a 10-yard pass from Chad Pennington to Laveranues Coles and a Mike Nugent FG, the Bills broke the game open with a
77-yard J. P. Losman pass to Lee Evans and a 58-yard interception return by Nate Clements. The Jets cut their deficit to
21-13 after a Nugent FG on the ensuing possession, but would end up scoreless for the rest of the game. Meanwhile, the Bills defense held the Jets in check as a Pennington fumble in the third quarter set up another J. P. Losman pass, this time to Robert Royal. The Bills would add a FG of their own in the fourth quarter to extend their lead to 31-13. With the win, not only did the Bills improve to 6-7, but they mathematically remained in playoff contention, two games behind current wild card occupants Jacksonville and Cincinnati.

Week 15: vs. Miami Dolphins

In order to remain in contention for the playoffs, the Bills had to defeat—and sweep—the Dolphins, which they did in convincing and dominating fashion. J. P. Losman played well with 200 yards passing, three touchdowns and no interceptions. However, his counterpart, Joey Harrington, was ineffective, throwing for only 98 yards with two interceptions and achieved a 0.0 passer rating. After a scoreless first quarter, Losman threw a 33-yard touchdown pass to Robert Royal, putting the Bills ahead 7-0 into halftime. In the third quarter, Losman threw a 27-yard pass to Josh Reed, putting the Bills up by two touchdowns 14-0. In the final quarter, Losman threw another TD pass, this time a 21-yarder to Lee Evans. Miami had the ball on Buffalo's 1-yard line with 0:06 remaining. Looking for a touchdown, Cleo Lemon threw a pass intended for Chris Chambers but was batted down at the line of scrimmage by Ryan Denney, keeping the Dolphins scoreless. With the win, the Bills improved to 7-7.

Week 16: vs. Tennessee Titans

After the victory over Miami, the Bills stayed home for a Week 16 intraconference game with the Tennessee Titans. The Titans (like the Bills) were 7-7 and also hunting for a wildcard berth. In the first quarter, Buffalo scored first with kicker Rian Lindell getting a 21-yard FG. Tennessee would respond with Vince Young completing a 22-yard pass to Bobby Wade. The Bills came back with Willis McGahee's 1-yard TD run. In the second quarter, the Titans regained the lead with kicker Rob Bironas getting a 42-yard and a 20-yard FG. Afterwards, the Bills came back with Lindell kicking a 36-yard and a 45-yard FG. Then, Tennessee went back into the lead with Young's 36-yard run. Buffalo would  score with another 21-yard FG from Lindell, this one before halftime. In the third quarter, J. P. Losman completed a 37-yard pass to Lee Evans and afterwards Lindell kicked a 24-yard FG.  In the fourth quarter, the Titans won the game with Young completing a 29-yard pass to Brandon Jones and Bironas' fifth FG of the game, a 30-yarder. J. P. Losman led the Bills on one final drive down to the Titans' 28-yard line, but driving against a wind that was gusting up to 20 mph, the Bills elected not to try a potential game-winning FG, sealing the game for the Titans. With the loss, not only did the Bills fall to 7-8 in their final home game of the season, but they were also eliminated from playoff contention heading into the season finale.

Week 17: at Baltimore Ravens

J. P. Losman threw for 237 yards, a touchdown and two interceptions, one of which a pick-six. Willis McGahee rushed for 23 yards on 11 carries. Lee Evans had seven receptions for 145 yards and the only score for Buffalo, a 44-yard TD. In the first quarter, Matt Stover made a
26-yard field goal, bringing the Ravens up 3-0 at the end of the first. Just before halftime, Stover made another field goal, this one from 37 yards out, for a 6-0 halftime lead. In the third quarter, Stover made his third field goal of the day, bringing the Ravens up 9-0. After Evans' TD, Losman threw a pass that was intercepted by Chris McAlister and returned for a touchdown. In the fourth quarter, Stover made his fourth and final field goal that increased the Ravens' lead to 19-7. With the loss, the Bills finished the season at 7-9, although it was an improvement over last year's 5-11 record.

Standings

References

Buffalo Bills
Buffalo Bills seasons
Buff